Anuak militants are an armed and organized liberation group belonging to the Anuak of the western part of Ethiopia. They are struggling to liberate Gambella people from oppressors.

Background
The Anuak people are one of the more than eighty ethnic groups in Ethiopia. Their villages are scattered along the rivers of southeastern Sudan and western Ethiopia. They speak a Nilotic language known as Dha Anywaa, which is spoken by several Anuaks in Ethiopia. For the most part, they are herdsmen and farmers and they practice mainly Animism, however there are small groups of Christian adherents. Currently there are around 300,000 Anuaks in Ethiopia. Historically, the Anyuak kingdom used to be a federation of villages headed by an independent Nyie. These villages were constantly feuding among themselves for the control of the Ocwak – the royal throne and bead. Traditionally, the Anyuak wear large amounts of beads and other artifacts like the tail of giraffe.

Issues
The Anuaks have many neighbor ethnic groups including the Ajiebo Murle, Nuer, Dhuok Suri, the Oromo, and Amhara (the highlanders). Their relationship with other ethnic groups is usually hostile and violent, especially with the Nuer who have pushed them to the east. There are many natural resources in western Ethiopia and adding more fuel to the violence is the more than eight languages spoken by other groups around the Anuak land.

Militant activities
After the current government came to power in 1991 it ruled the area through local parties, but real power was still in the hands of the local highlanders. And ethnic conflicts occur between the highlanders and the Anuaks, sometimes bringing in the Nuers as well. These ethnic problems began in the 1980s - when the previous Derg government used forced resettlement to bring about 50,000 people from Ethiopia's exhausted central highlands to the fertile, but swampy, malaria-infested Gambella region where the Anuaks and Nuers live. The Anuak rebels also attack miners and economic development workers in Gambela. In 2004 the militants killed three government refugee workers and attacked a United Nations vehicle.

In October, 2005 Anuak rebels attacked four police officers and prison wardens. Along with this attack the Anuak militants targeted the police station and prison to free many jailed rebel fighters. They also wounded six other men and murdered the Gambella Regional police commissioner.

Attacks on Nuers
Nuer are mostly refugees that moved east away from the Sudanese civil wars and sheltered in Ethiopia for several decades. They number in thousands and live in the Gambela Region of Ethiopia. Despite the attempt of the regional government to keep peace, Anuak rebels continue to attack Nuers. In August 2002, two Nuer men were stabbed several times by a group of Anuak youth in and around Gambella’s main market. Also in 2002, a hand grenade thrown onto a passenger Isuzu truck, full of Nuers traveling to Lare in Jikawo woreda, killing two instantly and wounding 18. One of the victims later died in hospital from his wounds. The attack took place at the Mobil fuel station in the middle of Gambela town. The attacker who was also wounded in the process was later held by the army and allegedly confessed that he was part of a bigger group organized to eliminate the Nuers. The plan was originally envisaged to attack the Nuer during the Ethiopian New Year celebration. A hand grenade was also thrown into a dormitory at the Teachers’ training College wounding six ethnic Nuer Sudanese refugees, one of them seriously. Same day a group of Anuak coming as far as the Abobo woreda attacked the Nuer settlement at Ochom for the second time, wounding four people, but killing 35 sheep, six cows and unspecified number of goats. Four households were burned down. Among the assailants, unspecified number was killed or wounded. Later in 2002, five Nuer men who went to cut bamboo for roofing on the road to the Anfillo woreda in the Oromia Region were ambushed, killing two and wounding one; the survivors identified their attackers as Anuaks. The perpetrators are still at large.

In June 2006, Anuak militants attacked a bus travelling from Addis Ababa to Gambela and killed fourteen passengers. Around 40 more people were injured and wounded in the attack.

See also
 Nuer people

References

Politics of Ethiopia
Politics of Sudan